The All-Ireland Senior Hurling Championship 1894 was the eighth series of the All-Ireland Senior Hurling Championship, Ireland's premier hurling knock-out competition.  Cork won the championship, beating Dublin in the final.

Teams

A total of five teams contested the championship.

Dublin (Rapparees) and Kilkenny (Confederation) were the only teams to enter the Leinster championship. They both automatically qualified for the provincial final.

Four teams, Cork (Blackrock), Kerry (Kilmoyley), Limerick and Tipperary (Drombane), contested the Munster championship.

There were no provincial championships in either Connacht or Ulster.

Format

Munster Championship

Semi-finals: (2 matches) The four participating teams make up the semi-final pairings.  Two teams are eliminated at this stage while the two winning teams advanced to the final.

Final: (1 match) The two semi-final winners contest this game.  One team is eliminated at this stage while the winners advance to the All-Ireland final.

All-Ireland Championship

Final: (1 match) The winners of the Munster championship play Dublin, the sole representatives of the Leinster championship, who received a bye to the final.

Results

Leinster Senior Hurling Championship

Munster Senior Hurling Championship

All-Ireland Senior Hurling Championship

Championship statistics

Miscellaneous

 Cork's defeat of Dublin in the All-Ireland final gives the team a third consecutive championship title.  The 5–20 to 2–0 score line, a defeat of twenty-nine points for Dublin, remains the second biggest defeat in a championship decider.

References

Sources

 Corry, Eoghan, The GAA Book of Lists (Hodder Headline Ireland, 2005).
 Donegan, Des, The Complete Handbook of Gaelic Games (DBA Publications Limited, 2005).

See also

1894